The Lancashire Infantry Museum, formerly known as the Queen's Lancashire Regiment Museum, is located at Fulwood Barracks in Preston, Lancashire, England.  The museum claims to be "largest Regimental archive and the premier centre for military historical research in the North of England."

History
The museum was founded as the museum of the Loyal Regiment (North Lancashire) in 1929. It chronicles the men of Lancashire who fought for their country during the wars. It also acts as an archive of battles fought by the Duke of Lancaster's Regiment and its antecedent regiments, including the Queen's Lancashire Regiment, the East Lancashire Regiment, the South Lancashire Regiment, the Loyal Regiment (North Lancashire) and the Lancashire Regiment (Prince of Wales's Volunteers). In all, the museum's collections cover 120 separate units, including the 59 battalions formed by the antecedent Lancashire regiments during the First World War, and all associated Militia, Rifle Volunteers, Territorials, Home Guard and Cadet units.

An important exhibit is the French Imperial Eagle captured by Ensign John Pratt of the 30th Regiment of Foot from the French 22nd Régiment d'Infanterie de Ligne at the Battle of Salamanca in July 1812. The museum also displays items from its collections in other area museums, including the Museum of Lancashire, Blackburn Museum and Art Gallery, Towneley Hall and Warrington Museum & Art Gallery.

References

External links
 Lancashire Infantry Museum - official site
 Army museums information

Museums in Preston
Regimental museums in England
Military history of Lancashire